Hossein Kiani is an Iranian football midfielder who currently played for Iranian football club Nassaji Mazandaran in the Persian Gulf League.

Club career

Early years
Kiani started his career with Shahrdari Arak in Azadegan League. Later he joined Persepolis Shoamal and Siah Jamegan.

Padideh
He joined Padideh in summer 2014 with two-years contract. He made his debut for Padideh in 2014–15 Iran Pro League against Naft Masjed Soleyman as substitute for Younes Shakeri.

Club career statistics

References

External links
 Hossein Kiani at PersianLeague.com
 Hossein Kiani at IranLeague.ir

Living people
Iranian footballers
Nassaji Mazandaran players
Shahr Khodro F.C. players
1992 births
Association football midfielders
People from Dargaz